Nobody is the second EP by Cartman and was released March 27, 2000 by Rocket Records and distributed by MGM Distribution.

Track listing
 "Nobody" - 3:47
 "Datsun 180B" - 2:29
 "One You're Without" - 3:41
 "Song For Absent Friends" 3:16
 "Think" - 3:27

Personnel
 Cain Turnley
 Joe Hawkins
 Scott Nicholls
 Ben Mills

References

Cartman (band) EPs
2000 EPs